Rotmanka  is a settlement in the administrative district of Gmina Pruszcz Gdański, within Gdańsk County, Pomeranian Voivodeship, in northern Poland. It Borders with a nearby village of Kowale to West, Borkowo to North and Pruszcz Gdański to East.

For details of the history of the region, see History of Pomerania.

The settlement has a population of 1,782.

Gallery

References

Villages in Gdańsk County